The Spanish Inquisition was a Catholic ecclesiastical tribunal established in Spain in 1478.

Spanish Inquisition may also refer to:

"The Spanish Inquisition" (Monty Python), a sketch by British comedy group Monty Python
Spanish Inquisition Necklace, an emerald and diamond necklace owned by the Smithsonian Institution
A weekly article in the metal music magazine Metal Hammer

See also

 
 Inquisition (disambiguation)